Terebra anilis is a species of sea snail, a marine gastropod mollusc in the family Terebridae, the auger snails.

Description
The length of the shell varies between 15 mm and 111 mm.

(Original description) The narrowly subulate shell is reddish brown. It contains 21 very flat whorls. These are sculptured with oblique, rather closely set transverse costae interrupted by spiral striae and two crenate sutural bands, the upper of which is much the broader. The sutures are scarcely impressed. The columella descendis in a curve, extending into a thick, projecting callus which joins the lip above. The peristome is sinuous and slightly reflexed. The aperture is narrowly ovate. The siphonal canal is short and recurved

Distribution
This marine species occurs in the Central Indo-West Pacific.

References

 Bratcher T. & Cernohorsky W.O. (1987). Living terebras of the world. A monograph of the recent Terebridae of the world. American Malacologists, Melbourne, Florida & Burlington, Massachusetts. 240pp
 Liu, J.Y. [Ruiyu] (ed.). (2008). Checklist of marine biota of China seas. China Science Press. 1267 pp
 Kilburn, R.N. & Rippey, E. (1982) Sea Shells of Southern Africa. Macmillan South Africa, Johannesburg, xi + 249 pp.

External links
 
 Lamarck, J.-B. de. (1822). Histoire naturelle des animaux sans vertèbres, présentant les caractères généraux et particuliers de ces animaux, leur distribution, leurs classes, leurs familles, leurs genres, et la citation des principales espèces qui s'y rapportent; précédée d'une introduction offrant la détermination des caractères essentiels de l'animal, sa distinction du végétal et des autres corps naturel; enfin, l'exposition des principes fondamentaux de la zoologie. Tome septième. 711 pp. Paris
 Fedosov, A. E.; Malcolm, G.; Terryn, Y.; Gorson, J.; Modica, M. V.; Holford, M.; Puillandre, N. (2020). Phylogenetic classification of the family Terebridae (Neogastropoda: Conoidea). Journal of Molluscan Studies

Terebridae
Gastropods described in 1798